Colin Myles Joseph MacCabe (born 9 February 1949) is an English academic, writer and film producer. He is currently a distinguished professor of English and film at the University of Pittsburgh.

Career
MacCabe was educated at St Benedict's School, Ealing, and Trinity College, Cambridge, where he took his first degree and doctorate entitled James Joyce and the Revolution of the Word (which was subsequently revised and published in 1978). While a graduate student he attended the Ecole Normale Superieure in Paris (1972–73), following courses by Louis Althusser, Etienne Balibar, Roland Barthes and Jacques Derrida. In 1974 he was elected a research fellow at Emmanuel College, Cambridge, where he remained from 1976 until 1981 as a university assistant lecturer in the history of Modern and Early Modern English in relation to literature, and also became a teaching fellow of King's College, Cambridge.

MacCabe became involved in Screen, a journal of film theory published by SEFT (Society for Education in Film and Television) becoming a member of its board in 1973–78 and contributing essays such as "Realism and Cinema: Notes on Some Brechtian Theses" (1974). This was a period that critic Robin Wood described as the "felt moment of Screen" – the time when critical theories emanating from Paris in the late 1960s began to intervene in Anglophone film culture. By releasing the energy and intellectual debate associated with a major paradigm shift, Screen posed a "formidable and sustained challenge to traditional aesthetics" and academia.

MacCabe came to public prominence in 1981 when he was denied tenure as a consequence of his position at the centre of a much publicised dispute within the faculty of English concerning the teaching of structuralism. His account of events was published three decades later in "A Tale of Two Theories".

After leaving Cambridge he took up a professorship of English at the University of Strathclyde (1981–85), where he was Head of Department and introduced graduate programmes, developing it as a centre for literary linguistics. After over a decade, in which he combined his positions at the British Film Institute with a one-semester appointment at the University of Pittsburgh, he took up a fractional professorship at the University of Exeter (1998–2006), and then at Birkbeck, University of London (1992–2006). He is currently visiting Professor of English at University College, London and at the Birkbeck Institute. In 2011 he taught for a semester in the Department of Cultural Studies at the English and Foreign Languages University in Hyderabad. He was a visiting Fellow at All Souls College, Oxford in the Michaelmas term of 2014. Since 1986 he has remained a professor of English at the University of Pittsburgh.

Writing and academic interests
MacCabe has published widely on film and literature with particular emphasis on James Joyce, Jean-Luc Godard, and topics in the history and theory of language. He has served as chairman of the London Consortium, which he co-founded with Mark Cousins, Paul Hirst, and Richard Humphreys. He has edited Critical Quarterly.

Funded by the AHRC, the Colonial Film Project 2007-2010 was co-directed with Lee Grieveson. Following Raymond Williams's pioneering work in the 1980s on a historically founded etymology – Keywords: A  Vocabulary of Culture and Society, which began in 2005 will be completed in 2017.

References

External links
 .
 MacCabe's homepage from University of Pittsburgh.
 MacCabe's website.

1949 births
Academics of the University of Exeter
Academics of the University of Strathclyde
Alumni of Trinity College, Cambridge
British writers
Fellows of King's College, Cambridge
Living people
People educated at St Benedict's School, Ealing
University of Pittsburgh faculty